Łącznik  is a village in the administrative district of Gmina Biała, within Prudnik County, Opole Voivodeship, in southern Poland.

The name of the village is of Polish origin and comes from the word łąka, which means "field".

References

Villages in Prudnik County